Rueland Frueauf the Elder (c. 1440 – 1507) was an Austrian Late-Gothic painter.

Biography
Frueauf was born in Obernberg am Inn, and lived and worked there most of his life. He primarily painted frescoes in local churches. In 1484 he was appointed as a consultant to work with Michael Pacher on an altarpiece for the Franciscan Order. His son Rueland Frueauf the Younger also became a painter. Frueauf the Elder died in Passau in 1507.

Gallery

References

15th-century Austrian painters
Austrian male painters
16th-century Austrian painters
1507 deaths
1440 births
Gothic painters